Amaurobius paon is a species of spider in the family Amaurobiidae, found in Greece.

References

paon
Spiders of Europe
Spiders described in 1993